Bronislav Gimpel (January 29, 1911 – May 1, 1979) was a Polish-American violinist, and teacher. He was born in Lemberg, Austria-Hungary, part of Polish Galicia (now Lviv, Ukraine), to a family of Jewish origin. Gimpel's older brother, Jakob Gimpel, was a noted concert pianist who also recorded music for motion pictures.

Early career
Bronislav Gimpel started piano and violin lessons with his father at the age of five. At the age of eight, he studied with Moritz Wolfsthal at the Lwów Conservatory. After 1922 he continued his studies with Robert Pollack at the Vienna Conservatory. 1925, at the age of fourteen, he played the Goldmark Concerto with the Vienna Symphony. A year later, an extended concert tour in Italy resulted in a succession of triumphs of historic proportion, with command performances before King Victor Emmanuel III of Italy and Pope Pius XI, and invitations to play on Paganini's famous Guarneri and to perform at the grave of the legendary virtuoso. Tours of South America and Europe followed. In 1928/29 he attended the Berlin Hochschule für Musik under the guidance of Prof. Carl Flesch. Thereafter he continued his solo career while holding the lead posts in Königsberg and Gothenburg.

Move to United States
Gimpel immigrated to the United States in 1937. On Otto Klemperer's initiative, he became concertmaster of the Los Angeles Philharmonic in July 1937. After serving in the U.S. Army from 1942 to the end of the war, Gimpel resumed his solo career in Europe, where he was received, once again, with great acclaim. In 1963, he and Władysław Szpilman formed "The Warsaw Piano Quintet". His recording of Dvorak's Violin Concerto is considered one of the best interpretations of this concerto.

Teaching positions
In 1967 Gimpel accepted a professorship at the University of Connecticut. From 1973 Gimpel was a professor at the Royal Northern College of Music in Manchester, England. In this period of time he resumed his solo concert appearances in Europe, the United States and South America.

Gimpel died in Los Angeles at age 68.

Footnotes

External links
 

1911 births
1979 deaths
American male violinists
Polish violinists
Jews from Galicia (Eastern Europe)
Jewish emigrants from Nazi Germany to the United States
Musicians from Lviv
Henryk Wieniawski Violin Competition prize-winners
20th-century American violinists
20th-century American male musicians